Romano Crivici (1953) is an Australian violinist, pianist and composer. 

Romano Crivici is one of Australia's only contemporary composers who is also a recognised contemporary classical performer on both violin and piano. Crivici, a former member of the Sydney Symphony Orchestra and the New England String Quartet, has also worked widely as a repetiteur and conductor. However it has been his work as composer, director and violinist with his group Elektra String Quartet and Elektra Collektiv, that has made a unique contribution.

The Elektra String Quartet, is best known for performing works by Crivici himself, as well as other Australian composers such as Nigel Westlake, Robert Davidson, Roger Dean, Mathew Hindson, Paul Stanhope, Martin Armiger , Ross Edwards and other contemporary works. Crivici founded the Elektra String Quartet in 1993 soon after leaving the Sydney Symphony Orchestra and created a disciplined and flexible ensemble that worked within many cross cultural art-forms. The ensemble featured works by Crivici himself as well as commissioning and performing works by some of Australia's best known composers. His personal connection to the Australian landscape has inspired many of his works including his recent Flat Earth for string quartet, didjeridu and percussion (2015), Landscape for string quartet (1999), Journey to a Mythical Place for string quartet (1993). His collaboration with indigenous artists has allowed him to create scores which "sensitively incorporate Indigenous elements", giving voice to a unique and evolving Australian style.

Crivici has also been commissioned by many organisations and ensembles including the Australian Broadcasting Corporation, Sydney Symphony Orchestra, Arafura Ensemble, 10 Days on the Island Festival, Sydney Film Festival, Fresh Ballet Company, Sydney Dance Company, One Extra Dance Company and Pacific Arts Festival.

At the height of Elektra's performance trajectory he completed a master's degree in Performance (Conducting) as well as a Diploma of Social Science (Anthropology) both at the University of Sydney.

Reflecting the larger scale of the works he now creates, Crivici has expanded Elektra String Quartet to a much larger ensemble Elektra Collectiv, which, now comprised both classical and jazz performers, he directs from the keyboard.

Elektra String Quartet 
Romano Crivici formed the Elektra String Quartet in 1990. It came to be considered one of Australia's most innovative and prolific ensembles in the contemporary music scene. 

Performing both nationally and internationally with tours of South America and Europe, it presented a range of music with particular focus on Australian composers, and the compositions of its director and founder, Romano Crivici.

Its 2015 concert series at Venue 505 in Sydney, won the Sydney Fringe Festival Genre Excellence Award for Best Musical Performance with its performance of Crivici's Gregorian Funk. 

The present line-up of musicians are drawn from the ranks of Sydney's professional players - Andrew Haveron (concert master of the Sydney Symphony Orchestra) and Romano Crivici on violin, Robert Harris, viola and Adrian Wallis (Sydney Symphony Orchestra) playing cello.

Sydney-based, Elektra came into being in 1990 in response to its members strongly felt need to go beyond the conventional limits, images and accepted boundaries of the traditional string quartet.

Performing both nationally and internationally Elektra received critical acclaim as a ground breaking, exciting and always accessible voice in the Australian contemporary music scene.

Crivici says - "Looking back, it is almost strange to remember the excitement and uniqueness of being in a position to explore, and participate in the creation of new music, new techniques, sounds and technologies, both amongst ourselves, and in collaboration with other musicians and composers.  As such, our performance philosophy consisted in balancing our experimental and improvisational musical explorations with solid core works in our programming"

Members of the quartet have changed over the years:

Mirka Rozmus, Jacob Plooj, Chris Latham, Romano Crivici on violin; Rudi Crivici on viola and Adrian Wallis, Marcus Hartstein, Peter Morrison, Emma Luxton, on cello.

Selected works
 String Quartet #5 Gregorian Funk 2015
 String Quartet #4 Undercurrents 2105
 Slavic Grooves & Meditations 2015 for flute, viola, piano, bass, percussion
 Reflections on Life Death & Transience 2014  for violin, viola & poet
 If Leaves Could Sing 2017 for piano
 Mantra 2004 for bass clarinet & string quartet

Recordings 
 Ebb & Flow 2017 No Self Records
 Stringlines 2012 Australian Broadcasting Corporation (ABC) Classics
 Flat Earth 2001 Australian Broadcasting Corporation (ABC) Classics
 Timeless 1999 No Self Records
 Luminous 1997 No Self Records
 Moving On 1993 Larrikan Records

References

1953 births
Living people
Australian classical violists